In 1972, the government of the Isle of Man, signed a long-term contract with the Pobjoy Mint of Tadworth, Surrey, England, to mint coins for the state. They have produced commemorative coinage.

Half-penny

1981: A 'Food for All' coin for the FAO.

Fifty pence

1979: Day of Tynwald.

See also

 Coins of the Manx pound

References

Isle of Man